New Hampshire Route 127 (abbreviated NH 127) is a  north–south state highway in central New Hampshire. The highway runs from Hopkinton in Merrimack County northward to Sanbornton in Belknap County.

The southern terminus of NH 127 is at U.S. Route 202 and New Hampshire Route 9 in Hopkinton, where the highway is known as Maple Street. The northern terminus of NH 127 is in Sanbornton at New Hampshire Route 132 as New Hampton Road.

Major intersections

References

External links

 New Hampshire State Route 127 on Flickr

127
Transportation in Merrimack County, New Hampshire
Transportation in Belknap County, New Hampshire